Yarhisar was one of the four s, based on the , purchased from France in 1907 by the Ottoman Navy Society. She joined the Ottoman Navy in 1907, but like the rest of the Ottoman fleet, she did not take part in any active engagement with the Italians during the Italo-Turkish war. During the Balkan Wars of 1912–1913, she took part in all major engagements such as the battles of Kaliakra, Elli and Lemnos, as well as patrol missions. During World War I, she took part in escort and interception missions, especially in the Sea of Marmara. She engaged in many battles with Allied submarines entering the Sea of Marmara. The submarine picked up the remaining crew from the sea and delivered them to an Ottoman sailing ship.

Design
Her hull was made of steel. Her crew, which consisted of 7 officers and 60 sailors when she was built in 1907, consisted of 74 Turks and 17 Germans by 1915 during World War I.

The ship was powered by two vertical triple-expansion steam engines, fed by steam from two water-tube boilers built by SA Chantiers et Ateliers de la Gironde. The ship could carry 60 tons of coal.

As built, the ship carried one Canon de 65 mm Modèle 1891 naval gun, six QF 3-pounder Hotchkiss guns and two 450 mm torpedo tubes.

Construction and purchase
At the turn of the 20th century, during a program to strengthen the Ottoman Navy, large quantities of cannons, ammunition and supplies were ordered from Krupp in 1904. In order to maintain diplomatic and financial balance, the Ottoman government decided to place subsequent orders with France. For this purpose, four Sultanhisar-class torpedo boats were ordered from Schneider-Creusot to meet the needs of the navy. As this small order was not sufficient for the French, the 200-ton s and the 420-ton Marmaris were also ordered. During negotiations in 1906, the French convinced the Ottoman government to purchase four more destroyers, which were ordered on January 22, 1906. Based on the French Durandal-class destroyers, Yarhisar, Samsun and Basra were built by Ateliers de la Gironde, while  was built by Schneider et Cie.

Operational history
Having joined the Ottoman navy in 1907, Yarhisar took part in training in May 1909 as part of the reforming program of Admiral Douglas Gamble, commander of the British naval mission in Istanbul. The torpedo boats , Mosul, Kütahya, Hamidiye, Demirhisar and Sivrihisar sailed from Sivriada and joined the fleet, practicing torpedo attacks against larger ships. Although the exercise was not in realistic combat conditions, it was the first naval exercise of the Ottoman Navy in twenty years. At the end of the exercise, all ships passed in front of the royal yacht Ertuğrul, which was waiting off Sarayburnu.

Italo-Turkish war
Prior to the Italo-Turkish war, Yarhisar was on a flag display and training cruise in the Mediterranean with a significant part of the fleet. The squadron, which had been maneuvering and training since July, had embarked on its annual mission to visit Beirut despite increasing political tensions. Under the command of Colonel Tahir (Burak), the fleet, consisting of two battleships, two cruisers, eight destroyers and one repair ship, left Istanbul on July 6, 1911 and sailed as far as Beirut, calling at important ports such as Midilli, Ayvalık, İzmir, Antalya, İskenderun and Latakia. When the fleet arrived at Chios Island on October 2 during its return, it learned that the war had started with the news brought by the yacht İzzettin which was sent from Istanbul and the fleet was ordered to return to Marmara. On October 5, Yarhisar and other ships arrived in Istanbul and completed their repairs, maintenance and preparations. On October 16, 1911, Yarhisar anchored at Cape Nara with the rest of the Ottoman fleet. She did not engage in direct combat with any Italian ships throughout the war.

Balkan Wars
Yarhisar was under repair at the shipyard on October 16, 1912, at the beginning of the First Balkan War. On October 29, they sailed for Varna with Mecidiye, but during the voyage they were assigned to protect the troop shipment to Midye. Yarhisar handed over her duty to  the next day and sailed to Varna with Mecidiye.

In early November, the navy was tasked with supporting the Ottoman Army, which was retreating after the Battle of Lule Burgas. The next day she sailed alone to Tekirdağ and returned to Silivri on November 7. The withdrawal of the army ended on November 8.

On November 21, 1912, she took part in the Battle of Kaliakra. The ships sailed into the Black Sea at 09:00 on the morning of November 20. After the repair of the broken down Berkefşan, she joined these two ships at 13:00 . After the meeting, the ships departed for Varna at 17:50 and dispersed at 20:00, heading for their duty areas. Yarhisar was in position at 21.30, followed by Berkefshan  at 00:00 as Hamidiye was sailing towards Varna. Meanwhile, four Bulgarian torpedo boats had been patrolling en masse outside Varna harbor since 22:20. At 00:40, in the battle that started between the Bulgarian torpedo boats and Hamidiye, she was damaged. Meanwhile, Yarhisar, seeing the battle to the north of her, remained in her duty area until 05:30, then went to the aid of Hamidiye. Despite the damage Hamidiye received, she did not sink thanks to the successful work of the crew,  but she was unable to continue her surveillance of Varna and decided to return to Constantinople, calling the torpedo cruiser Berk-i Satvet to the area, thinking that Yarhisar and Berkefşan would be insufficient for the mission. Upon this message, Berk-i Satvet abandoned its mission in Constanta and immediately set off. Berkefşan and Berk-i Satvet patrolled in front of the cape until morning. At 08:00 on November 21, when Yarhisar arrived at the rendezvous point and could not find Hamidiye and Berkefşan, the ship's commander decided to scout Varna. She made four passes within  of the city and was not subjected to fire from the shore or Bulgarian torpedo boats. Due to a storm, she sailed for Istanbul at 17:00. Meanwhile, the commander of Berk-i Satvet, thinking that his mission to watch Varna was over, sailed for Constanta and sent Berkefşan to Istanbul.

Yarhisar took part in the Battle of Elli on 16 December in the 2nd Destroyer Division under the command of Lieutenant Colonel Hakkı Eşref. Departing at 07:05, the division did not follow the main fleet and remained at the entrance of the Dardanelles and thus did not engage in direct combat.

After the Battle of Elli, the Ottoman Navy planned a landing on Bozcaada. A force of destroyers and cruisers, including the Yarhisar, was to land outside the Dardanelles, engage enemy forces north and south of Bozcaada, while the steamer Plevne was to land ground troops in the town of Bozcaada. The operation began on the morning of January 4; the navy moved out of the strait and observed the Greek forces. However, the troops had not yet boarded the steamer Plevne because they had not yet completed their deployment, and the navy commander was unaware of this delay. The fleet departed at 06:00; at 07:31 they encountered Greek destroyers. The Greek destroyers tried to draw the Ottoman force towards the main Greek force by staying out of gun range, while the Ottoman ships did not follow the Greeks and took up positions around Bozcaada. The First Destroyer Division took up positions to the west of Tavşan Island, while the Second Destroyer Division, which Yarhisar was attached to, took up positions to the east. Mecidiye and Berk-i Satvet took up positions to protect the north of the island, while Hamidiye took up positions to protect the south. Meanwhile, the ferry Plevne, which was to bring the land troops to the island, was still not ready; upon receiving this news, the commander of Hamidiye ordered the 1st and 2nd destroyer divisions to return to Çanakkale. Meanwhile, the 3rd destroyer division and battleships under the command of Colonel Ramiz, the Deputy Commander of the Navy, also departed; while the destroyers took security against submarines, the battleships sailed to Bozcaada. The returning 1st and 2nd destroyer divisions joined the battleships. At 11.30 the main force sighted 11 Greek destroyers in the direction of Tavşan Island; when the two cruisers broke from the line and attacked, the Greek destroyers turned back and sailed away. The battle between the two sides continued from 11:35 to 12:30, at which time the naval commander ordered to turn back. The ships anchored at Nara at 15::27. The operation failed because the troops could not be loaded onto the steamer Plevne.

In January 1913, an operation was planned to blockade the Greek forces in port of Lemnos and confine them to the harbor. On January 13, plans were prepared at a war council held on board the Barbaros Hayreddin. On January 14, the first diversion operation began. Hamidiye, Yarhisar and Basra anchored near the Dardanelles after revealing themselves to the Greek forces on the lookout in Imbros. Hamidiye set fire to the combustible materials piled on her deck and was engulfed in black smoke; she then radioed Barbaros that there was a fire aboard and that there were wounded, then anchored alongside Mecidiye on the coast of Erenköy. Hamidiye then crossed to the opposite side of the strait under the cover of night. Hamidiye secretly began her operation on 15 January after this diversion.

On the morning of 18 January, the Ottoman fleet resumed operations. Three battleships, two cruisers and six destroyers, including Yarhisar, and support ships from the Ottoman fleet started sailing at 07:15 in the morning before this battle, which would be known as the Battle of Lemnos. The Greek force also sailed from Lemnos at 09:10. At 11.35 a.m. the battle between the forces began. Due to the hits taken by the Ottoman battleships, the fleet turned back towards Çanakkale at 12:15. The battle lasted until 14:30, with the destroyers acting as support. At 14:55 the Ottoman fleet returned to the strait and anchored at Nara at 17:40. As a result of the battle, 4 officers and 37 sailors on Barbaros Hayreddin and Turgut Reis were killed while 7 officers and 97 sailors were wounded. Yarhisar was not damaged in the battle.

On February 8, prior to the Battle of Şarköy, sbe took Lieutenant Hamdi Bey to the front line at Şarköy. The next day, she was assigned to dispatch the incoming caravans to the port of Karabiga. On 26 March, Berk-i Satvet and Demirhisar accompanied the battleships Barbaros Hayreddin and Turgut Reis, which shelled Bulgarian positions from Kumburgaz.

First World War

As of mid-February 1915, Yarhisar was placed under the command of the Çanakkale Fortified Area Command, which was under the command of Lieutenant Colonel Arif Bey, Second-in-Command of the Navy. On April 27, 1915, the submarine  under the command of Lieutenant Colonel H.G. Stoker attacked the Yarhisar at Gallipoli, but when she failed to score a hit, she fled to Marmara Island. On 28 May, the submarine  detected Draç and Yarhisar with its periscope at around 02:00, but did not attack because of the risk of detection due to the cloudless night and bright moonlight. On June 17, Samsun and Yarhisar spotted and chased the British submarine  near the Bosphorus, but the submarine managed to escape. On August 7, Yarhisar,  and  departed from Istanbul and they guarded the salvage of the Peyk-i Şevket, which had been torpedoed and sunk in shallow water in Güvercinlik between Selimpaşa and Celaliye the day before by the submarines E11 and E14. Peyk-i Şevket was refloated two days later and taken to Istanbul for repairs. On the morning of August 22, Yarhisar, escorted by the tug Dofen and four sailing barges, encountered E11 near Marmara Island. After a collision with the submarine, Yarhisar turned and sailed away, while the submarine sank the tug and a barge and took 20 crew members prisoner. The prisoners were later transferred to an Ottoman ship. On October 5, Yarhisar attacked the submarine  at Mudanya, which sank three small sailboats and damaged the ship Edremit; H1 managed to escape under fire from the destroyer and nearby coastal batteries.

On November 6, 1915, E11, which started its third and last sortie in the Sea of Marmara, torpedoed Yarhisar which was sailing between Tuzla and Yalova at 12:30 on December 3, 1915. The torpedo hit the destroyer's aft boiler room and it subsequently exploded, splitting the ship in two and sinking it. Seven officers and 33 enlisted men from the crew of Yarhisar were killed. E11 surfaced and took the surviving Ottoman crew aboard it. The submarine rescued 3 officers, 42 enlisted men and 3 German privates, after which the crew was transferred to a passing sailboat and taken to Heybeliada.

Footnotes

References
 
 
 
 
 
 
 
 
 

World War I naval ships of the Ottoman Empire
1907 ships
Ships sunk by British submarines
Maritime incidents in 1915